Little Portugal is the nickname for the large Portuguese community in the South Lambeth area in South London, which is between Vauxhall, Stockwell and Brixton. Its central South Lambeth Road and connecting streets are home to many Portuguese cafes, bars and food shops.  7.6% of Lambeth are Portuguese-speakers, equating to roughly 25,000 people.

History
Many families from Portugal first settled in the area during the 1960s and 1970s. Many worked in the catering and hospitality trade, with some women gaining a reputation as efficient and courteous domestic servants. Later, others, with their savings, started to open restaurants on the South Lambeth Road.

Modern community
7.6% of Lambeth residents speak Portuguese, which works out to be roughly to 25,000 people across the whole borough., Much of this community centres around South Lambeth, making it the largest community within the Portuguese British population. The community mainly stem from Portuguese Atlantic Islander backgrounds (Madeiran and Azorean) although a sizeable minority of the community is Brazilian (mainly White Brazilian, as London attracts a disproportionate amount of White Brazilians) and Mainland Portuguese. 

Lambeth also has a small Galician population, with 2,000 Galicians in Lambeth (20% of the UK’s Galician population is located in Lambeth). Galicians speak the Galician language which is mutually intelligible with Portuguese, being closer to Portuguese than Spanish. The Galician community has assimilated into the Portuguese community of Lambeth. Relationships (friendships and marriages) between Galicians, Portuguese and/or Brazilians aren’t uncommon. 

A large number of Brazilians in Lambeth have Italian heritage (Italian heritage is common amongst White Brazilians - famous Italian footballers like Jorginho and Thiago Motta were born in Brazil yet have played for Italy as they are eligible due to Italian ancestry. Former Brazilian President Jair Bolsonaro also has Italian ancestry) however Brazilians of Italian descent in Lambeth don’t tend to speak Italian and identify firmly with the Portuguese community. 

Many London Portuguese can trace their origins to Madeira, with most of Little Portugal’s community being Madeiran. Other places in London with a considerable Portuguese population are the Golborne Road area in Notting Hill, and other areas around Ladbroke Grove.

See also
 Brixton
 Portuguese in the United Kingdom

References

External links
Profile on Little Portugal

Portugal–United Kingdom relations
Little Portugal
Districts of the London Borough of Lambeth
Areas of London
Brazilian communities
Portuguese neighborhoods
Portuguese diaspora in the United Kingdom